Patrick Bruce "Pat" Oliphant (born 24 July 1935) is an Australian-born American artist whose career spanned more than sixty years. His body of work as a whole focuses mostly on American and global politics, culture, and corruption; he is particularly known for his caricatures of American presidents and other powerful leaders. Over the course of his long career, Oliphant produced thousands of daily editorial cartoons, dozens of bronze sculptures, as well as a large oeuvre of drawings and paintings. He retired in 2015.

Biography

Australian period 
Oliphant was born in a private hospital in the Adelaide suburb of Maylands to Donald Knox Oliphant and Grace Lillian Oliphant, née Price, of Rosslyn Park.
He was raised in a small cabin in Aldgate, in the Adelaide Hills. His father worked as a draftsman for the government, and Oliphant credited him with sparking his interest in drawing. His early education was in a one-room schoolhouse, followed by Unley High School.

Oliphant's career in journalism began in 1952, when as a teenager, he began working as a copy boy with Adelaide's evening tabloid newspaper, The News, which had recently been inherited by Rupert Murdoch. He had no interest in going to college; he had an ambivalent relationship to formal education and already knew he wanted to be a journalist. In 1955, he moved to the News's rival The Advertiser, a morning broadsheet with 200,000 subscribers. Before long, editors noticed his interest in drawing and he began producing both cartoons and illustrations. The paper's conservative editorial policies frustrated him, and faced with the frequent veto of his commentaries on Australian politics, he learned that he was less likely to be censored for cartoons about international affairs. He found inspiration during this period in the work of English cartoonist Ronald Searle, the Western Australian cartoonist Paul Rigby, and Mad magazine's political commentary, which he called a "shot in the arm."

United States period

The Denver Post years 
In 1959, Oliphant went to the United States and Great Britain to learn about cartooning in those nations. He decided that he wanted to move to the United States. However, he had to wait five years until his contract with the Advertiser ran out. In 1964, while preparing to move without a job, he learned that cartoonist Paul Conrad was leaving the Denver Post. Oliphant sent a portfolio of work to the Post, and was hired over 50 American applicants. Oliphant moved to the United States with his wife, Hendrika DeVries, and his two children. The Post placed a small snippet of the day's Oliphant cartoon on the paper's front page as a "teaser" for what would be found on the editorial page.

Announcing his arrival, Time magazine stated, "Few U.S. cartoonists have so deftly distilled the spirit of [Lyndon B. Johnson and Barry Goldwater] as Australia's Patrick Bruce Oliphant, 29, a recent arrival who has not yet set eyes on either Johnson or Goldwater." Less than a year after Oliphant began working at the Denver Post, in April 1965, his work was syndicated internationally by the Los Angeles Times Syndicate. Oliphant's reputation grew swiftly, and in 1967, he was awarded the Pulitzer Prize for Editorial Cartooning for his 1 February 1966 cartoon They Won't Get Us To The Conference Table ... Will They? In this cartoon, Ho Chi Minh carries the body of a dead Vietnamese man in the posture of a Pietà. Oliphant had intentionally submitted a cartoon that he felt was among the weakest he had published that year. When it won, he roundly criticized the Pulitzer board, stating that they had selected the cartoon for its subject matter rather than the quality of the work. He refused to be considered for the award ever again and became a regular critic of the Pulitzer.

According to Ralph Steadman, Oliphant would have been Hunter S. Thompson's "first choice of a 'cartoonist collaborator.'"

The Washington Star years 
In 1975, Oliphant moved to The Washington Star, wooed by editor Jim Bellows. In 1980, he switched syndication companies, joining Universal Press Syndicate. The Star went out of business in 1981.

The independent years 
After the Star folded, Oliphant had offers from other newspapers, but decided to remain independent, living off the earnings from his extensive syndication. He was the first political cartoonist in the twentieth century to work independently from a home newspaper, a situation that provided him with a unique independence from editorial control. By this time, he had become a nationally recognized figure. In 1976, a survey of 188 cartoonists had found that fellow professionals saw Oliphant as the "best all-around cartoonist" on the editorial pages. A decade later, a similar survey made the same conclusion; at this time, the reasons given were Oliphant's original and influential aesthetic. He had become "quite simply the standard by which all other working cartoonists should be measured." Indeed, by 1983, Oliphant was the most widely syndicated American political cartoonist, with his work appearing in more than 500 newspapers. His work influenced the look of the field as a whole. For example, when he stopped using Duoshade, a chemical process for creating textured backgrounds, in the early 1980s, Oliphant noticed that the rest of the field followed suit. In 1990, The New York Times described him as "the most influential editorial cartoonist now working."

In 1979, Oliphant was naturalized as an American citizen. In 1983, he married his second wife, Mary Ann Kuhn. They divorced in 1994, and he married Susan C. Conway in 1996; they remain married today.

By 1995, Oliphant had reduced the frequency of his daily cartoons to four days a week. It was at this time that he began submitting his cartoons in digital form as scans of his original drawings. By 2014, he was submitting three cartoons a week.

In 2004, Oliphant moved from Washington, D.C. to Santa Fe, New Mexico. In 2012, Oliphant was the Roy Lichtenstein Artist in Resident at the American Academy in Rome for three months. Oliphant retired from publishing syndicated cartoons after 13 January 2015. He came out of retirement on 2 February 2017 with two images on The Nib of Donald Trump and Steve Bannon. One shows Trump as a childlike member of the Hitler Youth asking a ghoulish Steve Bannon what he thinks of his outfit.

Oliphant's style 
Oliphant's earliest cartoons in Australia often mimic the style of his elders, but his mature style is easily identifiable and distinctive. His caricatured subjects are immediately recognizable, and have been made "grotesque" through "extreme distortion." He is recognized for his skilled drafting, and for making unprecedented use of the horizontal format of the editorial cartoon space. As Rick Marschall noted in 1999, "Oliphant offered a style totally his own and revolutionary in the field. The Oliphant look—long-faced characters, sparse use of icons and labels, arresting "camera angles"—still dominates the field, at least in the minds of cartoonists who aspire to Oliphant's unflagging brilliance." Curator Harry Katz has called him "one of history's finest comic artists."

Oliphant has made a speciality of caricaturing American presidents, and multiple exhibitions have featured his work arranged by presidential administration. He developed tropes for various presidents: His dark, brooding Nixon is at times naked and ashamed, covering his privates like Adam and Eve, and at times making the "Victory" sign. Oliphant regularly portrayed the accident-prone Gerald Ford with a bandaid on his forehead. His fondness for Ronald Reagan did not protect that president, who is often portrayed as an oblivious buffoon in a parody of one of his films, while George H. W. Bush sometimes appears clutching a handbag and at other times is swathed in cloth as "Bush of Arabia." During the Clinton administration, he regularly used Socks the cat and Buddy the dog as a sort of "Greek chorus" to comment upon the happenings. He famously portrayed Barack Obama as an Easter Island head worshiped by voters. Oliphant found that it took time to find the right look for a new president, noting, "I hate changes of Administrations. It takes six months to 'get' a new man."

"Punk" 
Early in his career, Oliphant began to include a small penguin in almost every one of his political cartoons. This character, which he named Punk, joined a tradition of such secondary figures, which cartoonist R. C. Harvey has termed "dingbats". They appear in the work of earlier cartoonists such as Fred O. Seibel of the Richmond Times Dispatch, whose cartoons featured a small, ironic crow, and earlier by W.K. (William Keevil) Patrick of the New Orleans Times-Democrat and then Times-Picayune, who had a signature duck character. Punk was created after a colleague visiting South Australia's south coast brought back a penguin in a paper bag. The penguin was delivered to the zoo, and Oliphant decided to include him in a cartoon. Punk began as an easily identifiable Adelie Penguin, but swiftly became stylized and remained so for the rest of Oliphant's career. Punk adds a second layer of commentary to the subject of the panel. He is often placed in conversation with another tiny figure. Punk was popular with both adults and children, who could make a game of finding him in each cartoon. In 1980, Oliphant briefly drew a full-color comic strip featuring the penguin for the Sunday funny pages, titled Sunday Punk, but found the work too laborious and soon gave up the strip.

Oliphant originally created Punk as a space for subversion in the conservative editorial environment of the Adelaide Advertiser. Punk was a space for the cartoonist's own opinion, while the overall cartoon needed to hew to the views of the paper's editors. Punk's point of view changes from cartoon to cartoon: sometimes bemused, sometimes ironic, and sometimes trenchant, he does not always represent an opinion that can be assumed to be that of Oliphant himself.

Courting controversy 
Oliphant's cartoons are very rarely warm to their subjects: Oliphant has often noted that his job is to criticize, and that he has avoided getting to know his subjects because he is afraid he will like them. He intentionally courts backlash, saying in Rolling Stone in 1976, "This really isn't a business ... it's a cause. I'm an outcast because of it. A writer can’t really say, 'This man's an idiot,' because the law holds him back. We can say it." Oliphant has often remarked on his intention to draw criticism from all political perspectives from his cartoons, and has indeed received strong criticism by ethnic and religious groups alike for particular drawings. In 2001, the Asian American Journalists Association accused Oliphant of "cross[ing] the line from acerbic depiction to racial caricature". In 2005, the American-Arab Anti-Discrimination Committee expressed concern that some of Oliphant's caricatures were racist and misleading. In 2007, two Oliphant cartoons produced a similar response. A cartoon about Israel's December 2008 offensive against Hamas in Gaza sparked criticism among some American Jews: the cartoon courted this criticism actively by showed a jackbooted, headless figure representing Israel in a goosestepping posture, looming over a small female figure holding a baby labeled "Gaza." The Los Angeles-based Simon Wiesenthal Center said the cartoon denigrated and demonized Israel and mimicked Nazi propaganda. It called on the New York Times and other media groups to remove the cartoon from their websites. A 2005 cartoon showing Condoleezza Rice as a parrot perched on George W. Bush's shoulder was criticized by some readers for presenting her with buck teeth and exaggerated lips.

Oliphant's cartoons featuring Catholic scandals have been controversial: the Catholic League has called him "one of the most viciously anti-Catholic editorial cartoonists ever to have disgraced the pages of American newspapers." On Christmas Eve, 1993, Catholic readers were angered by a cartoon associating Michael Jackson and priests with child molestation. One of his most famous cartoons, "Celebration of Spring at St. Pedophilia's – the Annual Running of the Altar Boys," led to debates in print, radio, and television across the country when it was published on 20 March, 2002. The New York Times and Washington Post, as well as other papers, chose not to include the cartoon online, while an unknown number did not run it at all.

In 1987, Oliphant protested the selection of Berkeley Breathed for the Pulitzer Prize for Editorial Cartooning. Oliphant's concern was that Breathed's work "has, so far as I know, not appeared on one editorial page in the country." Addressing the Association of American Editorial Cartoonists convention to hearty applause, Oliphant represented the views of many of his colleagues: that the seriousness of editorial cartooning as a journalistic pursuit was at risk, and that the Pulitzer was encouraging the valuing of humor over political statement.

Non-newspaper drawings 
Newspaper editorial cartoons were not Oliphant's only genre. In his earliest days in Australia, he produced a wide variety of newspaper illustrations. Later in his career, he produced illustrations for a number of books and his work, often in full color, was featured in the pages and on the covers of numerous magazines. For a time he drew cartoons for Rolling Stone: this body of work is produced for a different audience than his newspaper cartoons, and is often more graphic or intentionally offensive than his work for the syndicate. In the 1990s he drew for a Northwest Airlines advertising campaign advocating the "open skies" policy concept. (Oliphant has flown privately and has had a pilot certificate.) By the early 1980s Oliphant had begun producing sculpture as well as editorial cartoons. In 1988, he began sitting in on William Christenberry's figure drawing classes at the Corcoran School. His work in all media has appeared in several exhibitions, most notably at the National Portrait Gallery. He has worked in pen and ink, oil, lithography, and other media.

Sculpture 
Oliphant began working in bronze in the early 1980s, and produced a significant body of work over the remainder of his career. His bronze caricatures have been compared favorably with those of the nineteenth-century French caricaturist Honoré Daumier. Oliphant's bronzes are frequently heads, busts, or full figure portraits of major political figures, though he has also sculpted animals, human types, and compositions containing multiple figures. His sculptures are in various scales, from a diminutive Jimmy Carter to a larger-than-life depiction of Angelina Eberly, an important figure in the famous Texas Archive War, located on the sidewalk on Congress Avenue in Austin, Texas near the Capitol.

Works in bronze 
 Tip O’Neill, 1985. Held by Albert and Shirley Small Special Collections Library
 Military Dance/Dancing Couple, 1986
 Klansman, 1987; edition of 3 . Held by Albert and Shirley Small Special Collections Library
 Harry Byrd; edition of 10. Held by Albert and Shirley Small Special Collections Library
 Artist and Model [Oliphant and Nixon]; unique. Held by Albert and Shirley Small Special Collections Library
 Nixon on Horseback, 1985; edition of 12 Held by National Portrait Gallery; Albert and Shirley Small Special Collections Library
 Nixon [victory sign]; edition of 10. Held by Albert and Shirley Small Special Collections Library
 Naked Nixon, n.d.; edition of 12. Held by National Portrait Gallery; Albert and Shirley Small Special Collections Library
 Lyndon Johnson, 1985; edition of 12. Held by National Portrait Gallery; Albert and Shirley Small Special Collections Library
 Reagan on Horseback, 1985; edition of 12. Held by National Portrait Gallery; Albert and Shirley Small Special Collections Library
 Gerald Ford, 1989. held by National Portrait Gallery; Albert and Shirley Small Special Collections Library
 Jimmy Carter, 1989; edition of 10. Held by National Portrait Gallery; Albert and Shirley Small Special Collections Library
 Clinton as Billy the Kid. Held by Albert and Shirley Small Special Collections Library
 George Bush [throwing horseshoes], 1989. Held by National Portrait Gallery; Albert and Shirley Small Special Collections Library
 Jesse Helms, 1991; edition of 12. Held by Albert and Shirley Small Special Collections Library
 General Schwartzkopf, 1991; edition of 12. Held by Albert and Shirley Small Special Collections Library
 Clark Clifford, 1991; edition of10. Held by Albert and Shirley Small Special Collections Library
 Rhino, 1992; Edition of 9
 Bush of Arabia, 1993; edition of 20. Held by Albert and Shirley Small Special Collections Library
 Cigar Dreams (Bill Clinton), 1999; edition of 9
 The Adjournment of the Luncheon Party, 2002
 Leadership [Bush and Cheney]
 Angelina Eberly, 2004
 Mrs. Levine, 2006; edition of 5. Held by Albert and Shirley Small Special Collections Library
 Rumsfeld, 2006; edition of 9
 Alan Greenspan, 2008; edition of 5. Held by Albert and Shirley Small Special Collections Library
 Daniel Patrick Moynihan; edition of 10. Held by National Portrait Gallery; Albert and Shirley Small Special Collections Library
 Obama: An Easter Island Figure, 2009; edition of 10

Publications

Exhibitions and catalogues 
 Cartoons by Pat Oliphant, Dimock Gallery, The George Washington University, October 1–29, 1970 (Checklist only.)
 Washington '76 Show (Chicago: Jack O'Grady Galleries, 1976)
 Mauldin / Oliphant: Origins (Washington, DC: Jane Haslem Gallery, 1982) Exhibition with Bill Mauldin.
 Oliphant's Presidents: Twenty-five Years of Caricature by Pat Oliphant (Kansas City: Andrews and McNeel, 1990)
 Politische Karikaturen in USA und in Deutschland (Landau: Thomas-Nast-Veriens, 1992). Exhibition with Gerhard Mester.
 A Window on the 1992 Campaign (New York: Princeton Club of New York, 1992). Pamphlet. Exhibition with David Levine, Edward Sorel, and Paul Conrad.
 Oliphant: The New World Order in Drawing and Sculpture 1983–1993 (Kansas City: Andrews and McMeel, 1994)
 Seven Presidents: The Art of Oliphant: 4 March 1995 – June 4, 1995 (San Diego Museum of Art, 1995)
 Oliphant in Washington, Rigby in New York: Two Australians Loose in America: 22 June–August 10, 1995 [Washington DC?, 1995?]. Exhibition with Paul Rigby.
 Oliphant's Anthem: Pat Oliphant at the Library of Congress (Kansas City: Andrews McMeel, 1998)
 Oliphant in Santa Fe (Santa Fe: Museum of Fine Arts, 2000)
 Leadership: Oliphant Cartoons and Sculpture from the Bush Years (Kansas City: Andrews McMeel, 2007)
 Patrick Olphant: A Survey: Selections from Rome and Other Works (Santa Fe: Gerald Peters Gallery, 2013).
 Oliphant: Unpacking the Archive (Charlottesville, VA: University of Virginia Library and UVA Press, 2019).

Print suites 
 The Nixon Series: Four new lithographs by Pat Oliphant (New York: Solo Press, 1985)
 Century's End (aquatints) Santa Fe: Landfall Press, undated)

Cartoon collections 
 The Oliphant Book: A Cartoon History of Our Times (New York: Simon & Schuster, 1969)
 Four More Years (New York: Simon & Schuster, 1973)
 Oliphant: An Informal Gathering (New York: Simon & Schuster, 1978)
 Oliphant!: A cartoon collection (Kansas City: Andrews and McMeel, 1980)
 The Jellybean Society: A cartoon collection (Kansas City: Andrews and McMeel, 1981)
 Ban This Book!: A Cartoon Collection (Kansas City: Andrews and McMeel, 1982)
 But Seriously, Folks!: More Cartoons (Kansas City: Andrews and McMeel, 1983)
 The Year of Living Perilously: More Cartoons (Kansas City: Andrews, McMeel and Parker, 1984)
 Make My Day!: More Cartoons (Kansas City: Andrews and McMeel, 1985)
 Between Rock and a Hard Place (Kansas City: Andrews, McMeel and Parker, 1986)
 Up to There in Alligators: More Cartoons (Kansas City: Andrews, McMeel and Parker, 1987)
 Nothing Basically Wrong: More Cartoons (Kansas City: Andrews and McMeel, 1988)
 What Those People Need Is a Puppy!: More Cartoons (Kansas City: Andrews and McMeel, 1989)
 Fashions for the New World Order: More Cartoons (Kansas City: Andrews and McMeel, 1991)
 Just Say No!: More Cartoons (Kansas City: Andrews, McMeel and Parker, 1992)
 Why Do I Feel Uneasy?: More Cartoons (Kansas City: Andrews and McMeel, 1993)
 Waiting for the Other Shoe to Drop ... More Cartoons (Kansas City: Andrews and McMeel, 1994)
 Off to the Revolution: More Cartoons (Kansas City: Andrews and McMeel, 1995)
 Reaffirm the Status Quo!: More Cartoons (Kansas City: Andrews McMeel, 1996)
 101 Things to Do With a Conservative (Kansas City, Andrews McMeel, 1996)
 So That's Where They Came From (Kansas City: Andrews McMeel, 1997)
 Are We There Yet? (Kansas City: Andrews McMeel, 1999)
 Now We're Going To Have To Spray For Politicians (Kansas City: Andrews McMeel, 2000)
 When We Can't See The Forest for the Bushes (Kansas City: Andrews McMeel, 2001)

Illustrated by Oliphant 
 Max Fatchen, Facing Up with Fatchen ([Adelaide]: Griffin Press, [1959]). Heavily illustrated by Pat Oliphant.
 John Osborne. The Third Year of the Nixon Watch (New York: Liveright, 1972). Illustrated by Pat Oliphant.
 Larry L. King, That Terrible Night Santa Got Lost in the Woods: a story (Encino, Calif.?: Encino Press, 1981). Illustrated by Pat Oliphant.
 Brian Kelly. Adventures in Porkland: How Washington Wastes your Money and Why they Won't Stop (New York: Villard, 1992). Illustrated by Pat Oliphant.
 Bruce Nash and Allan Zullo with Bill Hartigan. Golf's Most Outrageous Quotes: An Official Bad Golfers Association Book (Kansas City: Andrews McMeel, 1995). Illustrated by Pat Oliphant.
 Karen Walker and Pat Oliphant. Understanding Santa Fe Real Estate (Santa Fe: Karen Walker Real Estate, 1997).
 William C. Carson, Peter Becomes a Trail Man: The Story of a Boy's Journey on the Santa Fe Trail (Albuquerque: University of New Mexico Press, 2002). Illustrations by Pat Oliphant.

Text contributed by Oliphant 
 Aislin, Where's the Trough? and other Aislin Cartoons (Toronto: McClelland and Stewart, 1985). Introduction by Pat Oliphant.
 Dan Wasserman, We've Been Framed!: Cartoons (Boston: Faber and Faber, 1987). Introduction by Pat Oliphant.
 Bill Watterson, Something Under the Bed is Drooling (Kansas City: Andrews and McMeel, 1988). Foreword by Pat Oliphant.
 Jim Morin, Line of Fire: Political Cartoons (Miami: Florida International University Press, 1991). Foreword by Pat Oliphant.
 Bill Mitchell, Mitchell's View (Rochester, NY: Coconut Press, 1993). Foreword by Pat Oliphant.
 S. L. Harrison, Florida's Editorial Cartoonists: a Collection of Editorial Art (Sarasota: Pineapple Press, 1996). Foreword by Pat Oliphant.
 Kevin Kallaugher, KAL Draws a Crowd: Political Cartoons (Baltimore: Woodholme House, 1997). Foreword by Pat Oliphant.
 Asa E. Reid, Ace Reid and the Cowpokes Cartoons (Austin: University of Texas Press, 1999). Foreword by Pat Oliphant.
 Richard's Poor Almanack: Twelve Months of Misinformation in Handy Cartoon Form (Cincinnati: Emmis Books, 2004). Foreword by Pat Oliphant

Book cover art 
 Karl Kirchwey, Stumbling Blocks: Roman Poems (Triquarterly, 2017)
 Maureen Dowd, Bushworld: Enter at your own risk (New York: Putnam, 2004)
 P.J. O'Rourke, Thrown Under the Omnibus (New York: Atlantic Monthly, 2015)

Contributions to anthologies 
 Josef Josten, The Great Challenge (London: Pemrow Publication, 1958).

Animated films 
 A Snort History. Directed by Stan Phillips, animation by Pat Oliphant. 1971. Anti-drunk-driving video for Colorado Department of Health Denver Alcohol Safety Action Project.
 Choice Stakes. Directed by Stan Phillips. Animation concept and design by Pat Oliphant.1974. For the Environmental Protection Agency.

Awards and honors 
 Award-winner in the Grand Challenge Editorial Cartoonist Competition (London), 1958
 Sigma Delta Chi Distinguished Service Award, Society of Professional Journalists, 1966
 Pulitzer Prize for Editorial Cartooning, 1967
 Reuben Award for Outstanding Cartoonist of the Year, National Cartoonists Society 1968, 1972
 Distinguished Service Award, National Wildlife Federation, 1969
 Reuben Award for Editorial Cartooning, National Cartoonists Society, 1971, 1973, 1974, 1984, 1989, 1990, 1991
 Tajiri Award, American Civil Liberties Union, 1973
 National Headliners award for Editorial Cartooning
 National Cartoonist Society Editorial Cartoon Award, 1971, 1972, 1973, 1974, 1984, 1989, 1990, 1991
 Golden Plate Award of the American Academy of Achievement, 1974
 Honorary Doctor of Humane Letters, Dartmouth College, 1981
 Thomas Nast Prize, 1992
 Cartoonist of the year, Washington Journalism Review (1985, one other year)
 Inkpot Award, 2009

Personal life 
Oliphant is the nephew of Sir Mark Oliphant, the Australian physicist who worked on the Manhattan Project during World War II, and who later became Governor of South Australia. See Oliphant brothers for several other Australian relations.

Pat Oliphant enjoys flying and has had a commercial pilot's certificate. He has long been a member of the Bad Golfers Association. He is a left-handed vegetarian.

Archives and collections 
Oliphant's papers reside at the Albert and Shirley Small Special Collections Library at the University of Virginia, and include almost 7,000 daily cartoon drawings, dozens of sketchbooks, fine art on paper, sculpture, fan and hate mail, and extensive documentation of Oliphant's career. His works are held in the permanent collections of the Library of Congress, National Portrait Gallery, Gerald R. Ford Presidential Museum, the George W. Bush Library, The University of Colorado Library, and New Mexico Museum of Art in Santa Fe.

References

Further reading
 Heitzmann, William Ray. "The political cartoon as a teaching device." Teaching Political Science 6.2 (1979): 166–184. https://doi.org/10.1080/00922013.1979.11000158
 McCarthy, Michael P. "Political Cartoons in the History Classroom." History Teacher 11.1 (1977): 29–38. online

External links

 Official site at GoComics
 Oliphant's Pulitzer Prize-winning cartoon (1 February 1966)
Oliphant's Trump/Bannon cartoons at The Nib
 Oliphant's Anthem, Library of Congress exhibit
 
 

Australian editorial cartoonists
American editorial cartoonists
Australian political writers
Artists from Adelaide
Artists from Santa Fe, New Mexico
Australian expatriates in the United States
Honorary Officers of the Order of Australia
Pulitzer Prize for Editorial Cartooning winners
Reuben Award winners
The Denver Post people
The Washington Star people
Australian sculptors
Australian painters
Australian journalists
1935 births
Living people
Inkpot Award winners